The Anna Stadium is a stadium at the Anna Sports Complex located in the Indian city of Tiruchirappalli. The main football and athletics stadium, Anna Stadium, has a capacity of 10,000. The complex also houses a multi-purpose indoor stadium and has separate courts for sports such as tennis, badminton, basketball, football, kabaddi, hockey, and volleyball. The complex is located in Khajamalai, a suburb of Tiruchirappalli.

History 
The stadium was built by the Sports Development Authority of Tamil Nadu in 1970 at a cost of  funded by the state government. The synthetic turf imported from Netherlands, was laid in two weeks by a professional from England. In 2015, improvements to the indoor stadium, with wooden flooring were made. A new eight-lane synthetic athletic track, volleyball court, floodlights for the facilities and a new girls hostel were also installed. With this, Trichy became the fourth city in Tamil Nadu after Chennai, Coimbatore, and Madurai to have such facility for athletics.

Facilities 
The main athletics stadium, the Anna Stadium, has a capacity of 10,000. It also has an Astro turf hockey ground and an eight-lane  synthetic athletic track. The stadium also includes a gymnasium named Anna Indoor Stadium, swimming pool and a sports hostel. A multi-purpose indoor stadium inside the complex has courts for basketball, volleyball, badminton and handball. It has a capacity of 2,000.

See also 

 MGR Race Course Stadium
 Jawaharlal Nehru Stadium, Chennai

References

Citations

Cited references 

Sports venues in Tiruchirappalli
Indoor arenas in India
Basketball venues in India
Field hockey venues in India
Memorials to C. N. Annadurai
Multi-purpose stadiums in India
1970 establishments in Tamil Nadu
Sports venues completed in 1970
20th-century architecture in India